Gheorghe Simionov (born 4 June 1950) is a retired Romanian sprint canoeist. He competed in 500 m and 1000 m doubles at the 1976 Olympics, together with Gheorghe Danilov, and placed fourth and second, respectively. He won ten medals at the ICF Canoe Sprint World Championships with three golds (C-2 500 m: 1971; C-2 10000 m: 1966, 1970), five silvers (C-2 500 m: 1973, 1974; C-2 1000 m: 1975, 1978; C-2 10000 m: 1978), and two bronzes (C-2 500 m: 1978, C-2 1000 m: 1979). After 1975 he raced together with his younger brother Toma.

Simionov spent his entire career with CSA Steaua București, and after retiring from competitions stayed there as a coach. Since 1991 he trained canoers in Mexico.

References

External links

1950 births
Canoeists at the 1976 Summer Olympics
Living people
Olympic canoeists of Romania
Olympic silver medalists for Romania
Romanian male canoeists
Olympic medalists in canoeing
ICF Canoe Sprint World Championships medalists in Canadian

Medalists at the 1976 Summer Olympics